Imamia Public School Amsin, Faizabad, is an English, Hindi and Urdu, co-educational school from prep to grade 12 founded and run by Imamia public trust. The school is located on Amsin to chhoti amsin road in the Amsin, a gram panchayat of Faizabad district, in the Indian state of Uttar Pradesh.
Founded in ~1970 as Madrasa, the school works under the management of the Society of Imamia public trust.

References

High schools and secondary schools in Uttar Pradesh
Faizabad district
Educational institutions established in 1970
1970 establishments in Uttar Pradesh